Caxton College is a mixed private school located in Valencia (Spain) which offers complete education to students between 1 and 18 years of age, following the British National Curriculum in a multicultural environment.

History

Caxton College was founded in 1987 by the Gil-Marqués family and the current school principal is Amparo Gil Marqués. Honeste Vivereis the school motto, as the school aspires for students to “live honourably” and to establish firm future social relations based on sincerity, respect and responsibility.

The involvement with each of the students and the concern for their future are crucial to their overall education. All of the students receive strong academic guidance and are also taught good fellowship, support for those less fortunate, good social behaviour and to question the world around them, all within a framework combining the British and Spanish cultures.

Most of the students at Caxton College are Spanish.  However, an increasingly large percentage is international, with 20% of the student body currently coming from overseas.  Many of these international students live with their own families, while others board with host families.

80% of the teaching staff is British, and subjects from the British Curriculum are taught in English.  The rest are Spanish, and are responsible for subjects such as Spanish, Valencian, Social Sciences and Religion.

In 2017, the school was awarded as a British School Overseas, with the highest possible mark of “Outstanding” in all areas, after a voluntary inspection carried out by Cambridge Education and NABSS (National Association of British Schools in Spain).

External links

Official school website

See also
 Instituto Español Vicente Cañada Blanch - Spanish international school in London
 British migration to Spain

References

External links
 Official website

Schools in Spain
Educational institutions established in 1987
1987 establishments in Spain